La Bestia ("The Beast"), also known as El Tren de la Muerte ("The Train of Death") and El Tren de los Desconocidos ("The Train of the Unknowns"), refers to a freight train that starts its route in  Chiapas state in southern Mexico, near the border of Guatemala. From there it travels north to the Lecherías station on the outskirts of Mexico City, where it connects with a network of Mexican freight trains heading to different points on the U.S. border. It is estimated that each year, between 400,000 and 500,000 migrants, the majority of whom are from El Salvador, Guatemala, and Honduras, ride atop these trains in the effort to reach the United States. Although these trains (which transport products and materials including corn, cement, and minerals) are regarded as a free form of travel that allows migrants to avoid Mexico's numerous immigration checkpoints and 48 detention centers, the risks are high and many riders are left with life-altering injuries that limit their capacity to work.

As of May 9, 2014, train operators have banned the passengers from traveling by the train.

Passenger risks

Many of the dangers posed by this journey result from the train itself and the process of climbing aboard and getting off moving trains. Because migrants board between 10 and 15 trains during their 1450-mile journey, which typically begins in Arriaga, Chiapas, the chances of sustaining a major injury are high before they even arrive at the Lecherías station in Mexico City, which serves as a sort of halfway point before the train route scatters into various directions that head closer to different points on the U.S. border. Often, migrants fall asleep while riding atop trains and are jolted off and onto the tracks where many are killed instantly by decapitation, blood loss, and shock. Because accidents often occur during the night and in rural areas, victims are often not found immediately.

As with all migrant routes, those who use freight trains are subject to high rates of violence and property crime. Mexican states crossed by the freight trains also experience very high rates of kidnapping. Due to fears of deportation, it is believed that the actual rates of such crimes are higher than reported.

Reactions by citizens and the Mexican government

Many Central American migrants receive aid from Mexican families and community members who provide migrants with food, shelter, clothes, and medicine despite their own poverty. One such group is Las Patronas in Veracruz.

A government support service, called Grupos Beta, was also created to help migrants. Often, Grupos Beta ride along the train tracks and visit rest stops, where they provide medical aid and information to migrants. Essentially, they are a "mobile humanitarian unit [that] does not enforce the law." That is, their purpose is not to convince migrants to not ride the trains to the border, rather their goal is simply to educate migrants about how to protect themselves throughout their journey. Apart from Grupos Beta, the Mexican Government has been criticized for its relaxed approach to the countless instances of rights violations and abuses regarding Central American migrants.

Media coverage

"El Tren de la Muerte" has been depicted in literature, news articles, and in many films, including documentaries. One example is Which Way Home, which specifically follows the stories of children who have left their homes to come to the United States. The children range in age from 9–15 years old and are from places like Guatemala, Honduras, El Salvador, and Mexico. Like many other children, the kids in this documentary travel without an accompanying adult and their mode of transportation is "El Tren de la Muerte." These stories focus on the emotional impact of the journey as well as the physical danger. The documentary also shows what happens to children when they fail to arrive at their destination and are forced to go back to their countries of origin. Many of the other films that center around this topic feature similar stories, such as Sin nombre (Nameless) and De Nadie (About no one).

Salvadoran journalist Óscar Martínez's book The Beast also depicts the hardships faced by migrants on the journey to the United States.

American author Jeanine Cummins's novel American Dirt tells the story of several migrants who ride "La Bestia" through Mexico on their journey to the United States, and the difficulties they face along the way.

The train was also featured in Al Jazeera America's 2014 Borderland.

References

External links

Illegal immigration to the United States
Rail freight transport
Rail transportation in Mexico
Human rights in Mexico
Northern Triangle refugee crisis